Nicola Jackson (born 1960) is a New Zealand artist, born in Dunedin.

Jackson is best known for her small, highly detailed and vividly coloured papier-mâché three dimensional paintings. She frequently references domestic life and female identity in a very subtle way, occasionally reaching over into the expressively grotesque and medical anatomical taxonomy.

Jackson studied at the Ilam School of Fine Arts at the University of Canterbury, focusing on sculpture and printmaking. She received a prestigious Goethe-Institut scholarship to study in Germany in 1992 and in 1994 she was awarded the Frances Hodgkins Fellowship from the University of Otago.

Exhibitions by Jackson include:
 Nicola Jackson: Through the Eye of the Needle (solo show), Robert McDougall Art Gallery, 1989
 Fresh Art (group show), Robert McDougall and the Govett-Brewster Art Gallery, 1985
 Gruesome! (group show), Robert McDougall Art Gallery, 1999
 Child's Play (group show), Robert McDougall Art Gallery, 1995
 The Bloggs (solo show), Dunedin Public Art Gallery, 2017
Works by Jackson are held in collections throughout New Zealand including the Museum of New Zealand Te Papa Tongarewa and Christchurch Art Gallery Te Puna o Waiwhetu.

References

Further reading 
Artist files for Nicola Jackson are held at:
 Angela Morton Collection, Takapuna Library
 E. H. McCormick Research Library, Auckland Art Gallery Toi o Tāmaki
 Robert and Barbara Stewart Library and Archives, Christchurch Art Gallery Te Puna o Waiwhetu
 Hocken Collections Uare Taoka o Hākena
 Te Aka Matua Research Library, Museum of New Zealand Te Papa Tongarewa
 Macmillan Brown Library, University of Canterbury

Living people
New Zealand women painters
New Zealand painters
People associated with the Museum of New Zealand Te Papa Tongarewa
Ilam School of Fine Arts alumni
1960 births
Artists from Dunedin